Amherst County High School is a suburban public high school, grades 9–12, serving Amherst County, Virginia, United States. As the only high school in the county, it offers a comprehensive program from advanced (AP) classes to classes offered through a reciprocity program with local colleges that allow students to earn both high school and college credit at the same time. In addition to the academic program, the school has a comprehensive vocational-technical department that includes welding (offering certification), auto mechanics, LPN nursing (certification offered), EMT-B (certification offered), masonry, carpentry and agriculture.

Notable alumni
Ken Dixon (1978), professional baseball player for the Baltimore Orioles.

References

Public high schools in Virginia
Schools in Amherst County, Virginia
1955 establishments in Virginia